Phyllotreta liebecki is a species of flea beetle in the family Chrysomelidae. It is found in North America.

Classification 

 Kingdom Animalia: (Animals)
 Phylum Arthropoda: (Arthropods)
 Subphylum Hexapoda: (Hexapods)
 Class Insecta: (Insects)
 Order Coleoptera: (Beetles)
 Suborder Polyphaga: (Water, Rove, Scarab, Long-horned, Leaf and Snout Beetles)
 No Taxon: (Series Cucujiformia)
 Superfamily Chrysomeloidea: (Longhorn and Leaf Beetles)
 Family Chrysomelidae: (Leaf Beetles)
 Subfamily Galerucinae: (Skeletonizing Leaf Beetles and Flea Beetles)
 Tribe Alticini: (Flea Beetles)
 Genus: Phyllotreta
 Species liebecki: (Phyllotreta liebecki)

Size 
1.75-2.5 mm (Schaeffer 1919)

Identification 
Elongate oval. Shining black with sinuate yellow vitta on each elytron, vittae broadly attaining margni at apex. Head, pronotum, and elytra closely punctate.

First 4 antennal segments of liebecki light brown, 5-11 dark brown; male with 5th antennal segment stouter than striolata but less stout than in P. zimmermanni.

Elytral pattern shared with P. robusta; in males, the shape and length of antennal segment 5 is different: only slightly shorter than 2-4, dilated apically, but not with internal process like in P. robusta.

References

Further reading

 
 

Alticini
Articles created by Qbugbot
Beetles described in 1919